Diana Budisavljević (15 January 1891 – 20 August 1978) was an Austrian humanitarian who led a major relief effort in Yugoslavia during World War II. From October 1941, on her initiative and involving many co-workers, she organized and provided assistance to mostly Serbian Orthodox women and children detained in the Ustaše camps in the Independent State of Croatia, a Nazi puppet state established in occupied Yugoslavia. The operation, known as "Action Diana Budisavljević", succeeded in saving around 10,000 children. Budisavljević described the course of the Action in a diary, starting with 23 October 1941 and the final entry on 7 February 1947. The diary was released in Croatian in 2003. After her story was better publicized in 2012, she received substantial posthumous recognition.

Early life 
Born in Innsbruck, Diana Obexer married Julije Budisavljević in 1917, who at that time worked as an assistant at the surgical clinic in Innsbruck. By 1919, the couple had moved to Zagreb, at the time part of Kingdom of Serbs, Croats and Slovenes. Julije Budisavljević was an ethnic Serb (and brother of more well-known Srđan), who was known for founding the surgical clinic at the Faculty of Medicine, University of Zagreb.

World War II 

During World War II, Yugoslavia was invaded by the Axis forces in April 1941 and the Nazi-allied Independent State of Croatia began a genocidal campaign against Serbs, Jews and Roma, setting up numerous concentration camps in Croatia. After she learned about children held at the camp Lobor-Grad, in October 1941, together with a number of co-workers, in particular Marko Vidaković and Đuro Vukosavljević, she launched a relief campaign named "Action Diana Budisavljević". The Action took care of mostly Serbian children but also women held in various concentration camps including the Jasenovac death camps.

With the help from the local Jewish community in Zagreb, which had permission to support the camp inmates, her team sent supplies of food, medicines, clothes and also money, first to Lobor-Grad and later to the Gornja Rijeka camp and the Đakovo camp. Her team also helped the members of the Croatian Red Cross at the main railway station in Zagreb, providing travel supplies for workers in trains that stopped there on their way to forced labor in Germany – some of those men, women and children returned to Zagreb after they were stopped in Maribor and Linz and were not allowed to travel further due to their illness – they were taken care by the Red Cross and the Action. During that work, in March 1942, Budisavljević met the head nurse, Dragica Habazin, who became a close collaborator in the following months and years in helping the inmates from various camps that were relocated to Zagreb and other places.

At the beginning of July 1942, with assistance from German officer Gustav von Koczian, she obtained written permission to take the children from the Stara Gradiška concentration camp. With the help of the Ministry of Social Affairs, especially prof. Kamilo Bresler, she was able to relocate child inmates from the camp to Zagreb, Jastrebarsko and later also to Sisak.

After the rescue efforts in Stara Gradiška, Budisavljević, wearing the uniform of a Red Cross nurse, took part in the transport of children from Mlaka, Jablanac and Košutarica. More than 6,000 children had been moved away from those camps in July and August 1942. After obtaining permission in August 1942 to move the children from the institutions in Zagreb into the care of families, she and Kamilo Bresler worked together with the Zagreb Archdiocese branch of the Caritas and in that way made it possible for several thousands of children to be placed with families in Zagreb and rural communities.

According to the Correction of the Report from Marko Vidakovic in May 1945, Budisavljević stated that the Action succeeded in saving about 10,000 children from the concentration camps. At the request by Kamilo Bresler in August 1942, she and Ivanka Džakula, with some other co-workers, started to compile card-file information on children, based on transportation lists and sources from various institutions that kept their own lists. By the end of the war the files contained information of approximately 12,000 children. Upon a signed request on 28 May 1945 by a Federal State of Croatia official Tatjana Marinić, at that time Head of Ministry of Social Affairs, Budisavljević handed over the card-files. It is not known where they are now and whether they are preserved or not.

Later life 
Budisavljević was almost forgotten after the war, for decades publicly rarely mentioned or not at all, and if mentioned then described in a role not according to her real importance, because the post-war authorities did not look favorably upon her. She lived in Zagreb with her husband until 1972, when they moved back to Innsbruck. She died on 20 August 1978, aged 87.

Legacy

In 2003, the Croatian State Archives published Budisavljević's war-time diary, translated from German to Croatian by Silvija Szabo. Silvija Szabo is a granddaughter of Budisavljević and a retired professor at the Faculty of Humanities and Social Sciences, University of Zagreb, who in 2005 stated that she had read an April 1983 Vjesnik feuilleton that had described Diana Budisavljević as a "mere Communist Party activist inside the Red Cross". She knew that that had not been the truth, so she decided to read Budisavljević's diary to learn the full extent of her grandmother's deeds.

A Zagreb film production studio Hulahop produced a documentary about Diana Budisavljević, titled Dianina lista, and produced by Dana Budisavljević and Miljenka Čogelja. The documentary won the prize from the EAVE European Producers Workshop at the When East Meets West Forum in January 2012 in Trieste. One of the authors is a distant relative of Diana Budisavljević's husband, yet had not heard of her heroism until seeing a 2009 documentary about Zagreb in World War II.

On 15 February 2012, at the Serbian Statehood Day, the President of the Republic Boris Tadić posthumously decorated Diana Budisavljević with the Golden Medal of Miloš Obilić for courage and personal heroism. In October 2013, Serbian Patriarch Irinej posthumously awarded Diana Budisavljević with the high distinction of the Serbian Orthodox Church – the order of Empress Milica.

Since May 2012 a park in the Dubrava district of Zagreb has been named "Park Diane Budisavljević". Streets in Belgrade, Kozarska Dubica, and Gradiška have been named for Diana Budisavljević, and an initiative was active in 2015 to do so in Banja Luka as well. In October 2017, a Sisak park area with a memorial plate for children that had been hurt in the local concentration camp has been named "Park Diane Budisavljević". In September 2018, the local district representation of Donaustadt (Vienna), decided to name a local alley "Diana-Budisavljevic Gasse".

In 2017, Radio Television of Serbia, the Serbian public broadcast service, made a TV documentary film "Diana's Children" focusing on her work and the testimony of the children still alive who were saved in Operation DB.

A feature film The Diary of Diana B. premiered at the Pula Film Festival in 2019, and won numerous Golden Arena awards.

Her birthplace on Maria Theresia Street in Innsbruck is known as Obexer House.

See also 
Rescuers of Jews during the Holocaust

References

Sources

Further reading 
 
 
 
 
 
 

1891 births
1978 deaths
20th-century Austrian writers
20th-century Austrian women writers
People from Innsbruck
People from the County of Tyrol
Austrian expatriates in Yugoslavia
Austrian humanitarians
Women humanitarians
Austrian people of World War II
Recipients of the Medal for Bravery (Serbia)
20th-century diarists
Women diarists
Women in World War II
People from Zagreb